Two ships of the United States Navy have borne the name USS Shelton, named for Ensign James A. Shelton (1916–1942), who was killed in the Battle of Midway.

Sold to the Republic of China, she served as ROCS Lao Yang (DD-20) until she was decommissioned in 1999.

United States Navy ship names